Anastasia Alexandrovna Kravchenko (born 24 February 1986) is a Russian ski-orienteering competitor and World Champion. She won a gold medal in the long course, and a silver medal in the relay at the 2009 World Ski Orienteering Championships.

External links

References

1986 births
Living people
People from Komsomolsk-on-Amur
Russian orienteers
Female orienteers
Ski-orienteers
Sportspeople from Khabarovsk Krai
21st-century Russian women